John Paul Guzik III (July 12, 1936 – January 22, 2012) was an American football linebacker who played  three seasons in the National Football League and American Football League with the Los Angeles Rams and Houston Oilers. He was drafted by the Los Angeles Rams in the fourth round of the 1958 NFL Draft. Guzik played college football at the University of Pittsburgh and attended Cecil Township High School in Washington County, Pennsylvania.  He was a Consensus All-American in 1958. He was traded from the New York Giants to the Baltimore Colts for Jerry Richardson on August 3, 1961. He was a member of the Houston Oilers team that won the 1961 AFL championship.

References

External links
Just Sports Stats

1936 births
2012 deaths
Players of American football from Pennsylvania
American football linebackers
American football guards
Pittsburgh Panthers football players
Los Angeles Rams players
Houston Oilers players
All-American college football players
People from Washington County, Pennsylvania
American Football League players